Great Herring Pond is a  warm water pond mostly located in Plymouth, Massachusetts, with the southern portion extending into Bourne. The village of Pondville in the Cedarville section of Plymouth lies on the eastern shore of the pond. The pond has an average depth of 20 ft (6 m) and a maximum depth of 42 ft (13 m). The bottom is composed of sand, rubble and muck. A tire reef was installed in 1979 to
provide additional fish shelter. The inflow comes from Little Herring Pond, and the outflow goes into the Herring River in Bourne. The Public Access Board gravel ramp in Bourne enters shallow water and is therefore best suited for canoes, inflatable and other shallow-draft, hand-carried craft.

There has been multiple sightings of massive turtles on Great Herring Pond. They have been seen to be in size of 4–5 feet long, with heads the size of footballs.  They have been seen floating down stream from Little Herring Pond, under Carters Bridge.

In colonial days, a large village of Christian Indians lived nearby in a place called Comassekumkanet, which means "on the other side of the prince's house" in Algonquin.  Thomas Tupper, an early settler, preached to them though he was not ordained.

References

External links
Mass Division of Fisheries and Wildlife - Pond Maps

Bourne, Massachusetts
Ponds of Barnstable County, Massachusetts
Ponds of Plymouth, Massachusetts